Maria Beatrice of Savoy (Maria Beatrice Vittoria Giuseppina; 6 December 1792 – 15 September 1840) was Duchess of Modena by marriage to Francis IV, Duke of Modena.

Biography

Early life
Maria Beatrice was born on 6 December 1792 in Turin. She was the eldest daughter of Victor Emmanuel, Duke of Aosta, and his wife Maria Teresa of Austria-Este. Her father became King of Sardinia unexpectedly in 1802 when Charles Emmanuel IV abdicated.

Her maternal grandparents were Archduke Ferdinand of Austria-Este and Maria Beatrice Ricciarda d'Este. Ferdinand was the third son of Francis I, Holy Roman Emperor, and Maria Theresa of Austria. Maria Beatrice was the eldest daughter of Ercole III d'Este and Maria Theresa, Princess of Carrara.

In December 1798, Maria Beatrice left Turin with her parents and uncles to escape the French Revolutionary and Napoleonic Wars. They fled to Parma, then to Florence, and finally settled at Sardinia, the last dominion held by Kingdom of Sardinia. Maria Beatrice spent most of her time at Cagliari in the following thirteen years.

Marriage
On 20 June 1812, Maria Beatrice married her maternal uncle Francis, Archduke of Austria-Este; due to their close relation, a special dispensation was received for their marriage from Pope Pius VII. 

The couple left Sardinia on 15 July 1813 for Zakynthos Island, and then sailed to Trieste off the east shore of Adriatic Sea, finally reaching Vienna by land.

Duchess of Modena
In 1814, Maria Beatrice's husband became Francis IV, Duke of Modena, Reggio, and Mirandola on 14 July 1814, thereby elevating Maria Beatrice to the rank of Duchess of Modena. On the invasion of Joachim Murat during The Hundred Days, they fled Modena until 15 May 1815.

On the outbreak of revolution, Maria Beatrice had to flee Modena again with her family on 5 February 1831, but with Austrian military assistance the Ducal family was able to return within a year.

Maria Beatrice died of a heart condition on 15 September 1840 at Castello del Catajo. Her remains were kept in the Chiesa di San Vincenzo in Modena. She was a Lady of the Austrian Order of the Starry Cross.

Jacobite claims
Through her father, she inherited the Jacobite claim to the thrones of England, Scotland, and Ireland, but like other non-Stuart pretenders, she never asserted her claim.  Had she gained the throne she would have been Mary III & II.

Issue
Her marriage beget four children:

Maria Theresa, Archduchess of Austria-Este (14 July 1817 – 25 March 1886), married Henri, Count of Chambord.
Francis V, Duke of Modena (1 June 1819 – 20 November 1875), married Princess Adelgunde of Bavaria.
Ferdinand Karl Viktor, Archduke of Austria-Este (20 July 1821 – 15 December 1849), married Archduchess Elisabeth Franziska of Austria (daughter of Archduke Josef Anton of Austria and his third wife Duchess Maria Dorothea of Württemberg).
Archduchess Maria Beatrix of Austria-Este (13 February 1824 – 18 March 1906), married Juan, Count of Montizón.

Ancestry

References

|-

1792 births
1840 deaths
19th-century Italian people
19th-century Italian women
Austria-Este
Jacobite pretenders
Princesses of Savoy
Duchesses of Modena
Duchesses of Reggio
Duchesses of Massa
Princesses of Carrara
Nobility from Turin
Daughters of kings